Chengbei Township is a township of Xuwen County in far southwestern Guangdong province, China, situated adjacent to the county seat. , it has 14 villages under its administration.

See also 
 List of township-level divisions of Guangdong

References 

Township-level divisions of Guangdong